Raphaël Alexis Marcel Rouquier (born 9 December 1969) is a French mathematician and 
a professor of mathematics at UCLA.

Education 

Rouquier was born in Étampes, France.

Rouquier studied at the École Normale Supérieure from 1988 to 1989 and from 1989 to 1990 for a DEA in mathematics under the direction of Michel Broué, where he continued to study for his PhD. Rouquier spent the second year of his PhD study at the University of Cambridge under the supervision of J. G. Thompson.

Career 

He was hired by the CNRS in 1992 where he completed his PhD (1992) and Habilitation (1998–1999). He was appointed director of research there in 2003. From 2005 to 2006 he was Professor of Representation Theory at the Department of Pure Mathematics at the University of Leeds before moving to the University of Oxford as the Waynflete Professor of Pure Mathematics. In 2012, he moved to UCLA.

Awards and honors
He was awarded the Whitehead Prize in 2006 and the Adams Prize in 2009 for contributions to representation theory. He was awarded the Elie Cartan Prize in 2009.
In 2012 he became a fellow of the American Mathematical Society. In 2015 he became a Simons Investigator.

He gave the Peccot Lectures at Collège de France in 2000, the Whittemore Lectures at Yale University in 2005, an Algebra Section lecture at the International Congress of Mathematicians in 2006, the Albert Lectures at the University of Chicago in 2008, the Moursund Lectures at the University of Oregon in 2013, the Simons Lectures at MIT in 2013, the CBMS Lectures in 2014 and the Ellis Kolchin Memorial Lecture at Columbia University in 2016.

Notes

External links 
 Raphaël Rouquier at Oxford
 Raphaël Rouquier at UCLA
 

1969 births
Living people
École Normale Supérieure alumni
People from Étampes
20th-century French mathematicians
21st-century French mathematicians
Fellows of Magdalen College, Oxford
Fellows of the American Mathematical Society
Waynflete Professors of Pure Mathematics
Whitehead Prize winners
Academics of the University of Leeds
Simons Investigator
Research directors of the French National Centre for Scientific Research